Cecil D. Andrus Wildlife Management Area (WMA) is a  Idaho wildlife management area in Washington County,  from Cambridge, Idaho. The WMA was formed in 1993, when the Mellon Foundation purchased the Hillman Ranch and deeded it to the Idaho Department of Fish and Game for wildlife conservation. The WMA now manages additional lands as well, primarily from the Idaho Department of Lands, but also from Payette National Forest and the Bureau of Land Management. It is named for Cecil D. Andrus, a former U.S. Secretary of the Interior who also served four terms as Governor of Idaho.

The WMA is located along the Brownlee Reservoir on the Snake River near the Oregon border. Mule deer and elk are the most common big game animals in the WMA, but many other species including bighorn sheep and golden eagles can be found there.

References

Protected areas established in 1993
Protected areas of Washington County, Idaho
Wildlife management areas of Idaho